Allied powers are nations that have joined in an alliance. More specifically, the term may refer to:

 Allies of World War I, member nations of the World War I Alliance
 Allies of World War II, member nations of the World War II Alliance
 Allied Powers (Maritime Courts) Act 1941 (C.21) of the Parliament of the United Kingdom
Allied Powers (horse), an Irish racehorse
The Allied Powers (professional wrestling), a short-lived tag team

See also 
 Allied (disambiguation)
 Allied Forces (disambiguation)